The following is a list of male underwear models. This is not a complete list and includes men who have modeled underwear as well as fashion apparel from all over the world. This list excludes models dedicated to pornographic and erotic photography, who may pose in underwear, but the final purpose is to see them naked.

List of male underwear models

A–F

 Tyson Ballou
 Nick Bateman
 Eugen Bauder
 Tyson Beckford
 David Beckham
 Michael Bergin
 Justin Bieber
 Andre Birleanu
 Pietro Boselli
 Nick Bracks
 Mehcad Brooks
 Lars Burmeister
 Cody Calafiore
 Dan Carter
 Anthony Catanzaro
 Will Chalker
 Alex Cheesman
 Oliver Cheshire
 Michael Clarke
 Ben Cohen
 Didier Cohen
 Jai Courtney
 Francesco Cura
 Alberto de la Bella
 Justin Deeley
 Varun Dhawan
 Nyle DiMarco
 Jamie Dornan
 Luca Dotto
 Sandor Earl
 Oscar Emboaba
 Thom Evans
 Travis Fimmel
 Ben Foden
 Mark Foster
 Nolan Gerard Funk

G–L

 David Gandy
 Angelo Garcia
 Justin Gaston
 Robert Grabarz
 Calvin Harris
 James Haskell
 Djimon Hounsou
 Christof Innerhofer
 Ben Patrick Johnson
 Mitchell Johnson
 Rusty Joiner
 Nick Jonas
 Daren Kagasoff
 Brian Kehoe
 Salman Khan
 Jon Kortajarena
 Arthur Kulkov
 Akshay Kumar
 Camille Lacourt
 Francisco Lachowski
 Todd Lasance
 Kayne Lawton
 Marios Lekkas
 William Levy
 Freddie Ljungberg
 Ryan Lochte
 Mario Lopez
 Alex Lundqvist
 Kellan Lutz

M–R

 Filippo Magnini
 James Magnussen
 Fabio Mancini
 Javi Martínez
 Mariano Martínez
 Shawn Mendes
 Lionel Messi
 Scott McGregor
 Noah Mills
 Matthew Mitcham
 Christian Monzon
 Miro Moreira
 Rafael Nadal
 Hidetoshi Nakata
 Garrett Neff
 Simon Nessman
 Felix Neureuther
 Brett Novek
 Aitor Ocio
 Jim Palmer
 Horacio Pancheri
 Lance Parker
 Lukas Podolski
 John Quinlan
 Patrick Rafter
 Stuart Reardon
 Adam Rickitt
 Alan Ritchson
 James Rodríguez
 Cristiano Ronaldo
 Massimiliano Rosolino

S–Z

 Antonio Sabato Jr
 Chris Salvatore
 Danny Schwarz
 Adam Senn
 Tomas Skoloudik
 Christian Sprenger
 Andrew Stetson
 Eamon Sullivan
 Marlon Teixeira
 Ian Thorpe
 Janko Tipsarevic
 Andrés Velencoso
 Fernando Verdasco
 Mark Wahlberg
 Tony Ward
 Joel West
 David Williams
 Robert Scott Wilson
 David Witts
 Nick Youngquest
 David Zepeda

References

External links
 The Calvin Klein Underwear Model
 Male Underwear Models Listing - The Underwear Expert
 Underwear Model Pics - The Underwear Expert

Underwear models
Male underwear
Underwear
Male models